The 2017 Mid-Eastern Athletic Conference women's basketball tournament will take place March 6–11, 2017, at the Norfolk Scope in Norfolk, Virginia. First round games will be played March 6 and March 7, with the quarterfinal games played on March 8 and 9. The semifinals will be held March 10, with the championship game on March 11.

Seeds 
The top 13 teams are eligible for the tournament.

Teams were seeded by record within the conference, with a tiebreaker system to seed teams with identical conference records.

Schedule

Bracket

References

External links
 Official site

2016–17 NCAA Division I women's basketball season
MEAC women's basketball tournament
Basketball competitions in Norfolk, Virginia
College basketball tournaments in Virginia
Women's sports in Virginia